Family Farm Seaside, one of the top grossing mobile games developed and published by the Beijing-based videogame company FunPlus, is a farming game available for free on both iOS and Android platforms, and available in 18 languages.

The game has received positive reception from the public, and according to CNET "it was ranked around 100 on Apple's list of highest grossing apps on the App Store, and around the 135th most downloaded free software, according to data compiled by App Annie". In 2014 Social Times also reported that "Family Farm Seaside has a DAU/MAU engagement of over 35 percent, compared to 18 percent for Farmville, and 20 percent for Farmville 2".

By June 2015 Family Farm Seaside had more than 60 million active users.

Gameplay
Starting with a small farm near a beach, players need to take care of their farms through planting and harvesting crops, feeding animals, and constructing buildings and machines. In-game items may be sold for "Coins", a virtual currency.

External links
Official site

References

Android (operating system) games
IOS games
Mobile games